Forest Ridge is a rural locality in the Toowoomba Region, Queensland, Australia.

Geography 
The land use is rural residential with large acreage blocks.

The Gore Highway forms the southern boundary of the locality.

Education 
There are no schools in Forest Ridge. The nearest primary and secondary school to Year 10 is in Millmerran and the nearest secondary school to Year 12 in is Pittsworth.

References 

Toowoomba Region
Localities in Queensland